Damankanyah  is a town and sub-prefecture in the Kindia Prefecture in the Kindia Region of western Guinea.

References

Sub-prefectures of the Kindia Region